Ataur Rahman Khan Kaiser (September 7, 1940 – October 9, 2010)  is a Bangladesh Awami League politician and the former Member of the National Assembly of Pakistan.

Early life
Kaiser completed his master's degree in Art from the University of Dhaka in Political Science.

Career
Kaiser joined Awami League in 1969 after being inspired by Awami League politician M. A. Aziz. He was elected to the National Assembly of Pakistan from Anwara-Banshkhali-Kutubdia in Chittagong District in 1970. After the Independence of Bangladesh, he was elected General Secretary of South Chittagong unit of Bangladesh Awami League. He was made the Ambassador of Bangladesh to Russia and South Korea. He was a Presidium Member of Bangladesh Awami League.

Death
Kaiser was injured in a road accident while on his way to the funeral of Osman Sarwar Alam Chowdhury on 28 August 2010. He received treatment at Apollo Hospital Dhaka and later was sent to Singapore. He was brought back to Bangladesh and admitted to Chittagong Medical College Hospital. He died on 9 October 2010 in Chittagong Medical College Hospital, Bangladesh.

References

Awami League politicians
2010 deaths
People from Anwara Upazila
University of Dhaka alumni
Ambassadors of Bangladesh to Russia
Ambassadors of Bangladesh to South Korea
Road incident deaths in Bangladesh
1940 births
20th-century Bengalis
21st-century Bengalis